Promacrauchenia  is an extinct genus of macraucheniids that lived during the Late Miocene to Late Pliocene epochs of what is now Argentina and Bolivia. It belongs to the subfamily Macraucheniinae, which also includes Huayqueriana, Macrauchenia, and Xenorhinotherium. Fossils of this genus have been found in the Ituzaingó, Andalhuala, and Cerro Azul Formations of Argentina.

Classification 
The genus Promacrauchenia  was first described by Florentino Ameghino in 1904, on the basis of fossils found in Patagonia in lower Pliocene deposits and which Ameghino himself, years earlier, had described as a species of Macrauchenia, as M. antiqua . In addition to the type species, Promacrauchenia antiqua, other species have been assigned to this genus: P. calchaquiorum, P. chapadmalense, P. ensenadense, P. kraglievichi and P. yepesi.

Promacrauchenia was a member of the Macraucheniidae, a group of litopterns whose evolution led to the development of camel-like forms with strange nasal bones. Promacrauchenia, in particular, was a specialized macraucheniid, perhaps directly ancestral to genera such as Macrauchenia and Windhausenia.

The following cladogram of the Macraucheniidae is based on McGrath et al. 2018, showing the position of Promacrauchenia.

References 

Macraucheniids
Prehistoric placental genera
Miocene mammals of South America
Pliocene mammals of South America
Uquian
Chapadmalalan
Montehermosan
Huayquerian
Neogene Argentina
Fossils of Argentina
Neogene Bolivia
Fossils of Bolivia
Taxa named by Florentino Ameghino
Fossil taxa described in 1904
Ituzaingó Formation
Cerro Azul Formation